Ruben Jones (February 5, 1894 – February 14, 1970), also spelled "Reuben", was an American Negro league outfielder and manager.

A native of Austin, Texas, Jones made his Negro leagues debut in 1923 for the Birmingham Black Barons. He played five seasons with Birmingham, and served as the club's player-manager in 1927. Jones went on to manage the Memphis Red Sox and Houston Eagles in the 1940s. He died in Big Spring, Texas in 1970 at age 76.

References

External links
 and Baseball-Reference Black Baseball stats and Seamheads

1894 births
1970 deaths
Birmingham Black Barons players
Chicago American Giants players
Cleveland Red Sox players
Indianapolis ABCs players
Little Rock Grays players
Negro league baseball managers
Baseball outfielders
Baseball players from Austin, Texas
20th-century African-American sportspeople